Luo Zhenyu or Lo Chen-yü (August 8, 1866 – May 14, 1940), courtesy name Shuyun (叔蘊), was a Chinese classical scholar, philologist, epigrapher, antiquarian and Qing loyalist.

Biography
A native of Huai'an, Luo began to publish works of agriculture in Shanghai after the First Sino-Japanese War. With his friends, he set up Dongwen Xueshe, a Japanese language teaching school in 1896. One of the students was Wang Guowei.

Luo first visited Japan in 1901 to study the Japanese educational system. From 1906 onwards, he held several different government posts, mostly related to agriculture. From April 1909 to February 1912 he was president of the Imperial Agricultural College. Being a loyalist to the Qing Dynasty, he fled to Japan after the Xinhai Revolution, residing in Kyoto and doing some research on Chinese archaeology. He returned to Tianjin in China in 1919, taking part in political activities aimed at restoration of deposed Qing Emperor Puyi. Luo eventually rose to become one of the three main advisors and a trusted confidant of the emperor.

After the creation of the Japanese puppet state of Manchukuo in March 1932, Luo accepted a post in the new government from 1933 to 1938, insisting on maintaining Manchukuo as a monarchy against various proposals to make it a republic. He also served as chairman of the Japan-Manchukuo Cultural Cooperation Society. However, Luo gradually became disillusioned with the heavy-handed administration of the Japanese Kwantung Army and the lack of all real authority or political power by the nominal emperor Puyi, and resigned his positions in 1938, retiring to Dalian.

Luo's political activities during the wartime period and association with the collaborationist Manchukuo government have tended to overshadow his accomplishments as a scholar. He worked throughout his life to preserve Chinese antiques, especially oracle bones, bamboo and wooden slips, and Dunhuang manuscripts, all of which are invaluable materials for understanding ancient China. He was one of the first scholars to decipher the oracle bone script, and produced many important scholarly works researching the bronzeware script. He helped publish Liu E's Tieyun Canggui, the first collection of oracle bones, and Sun Yirang's Qiwen Juli, the first work of decipherment of the oracle bone script. Luo's own work Yinxu Shuqi Kaoshi still occupies an important place in the study of oracle bone script.

He was also the first modern scholar to become interested in the Tangut script, and published a number of dissertations on the subject in 1912 and 1927.

References
 He Jiuying 何九盈 (1995). Zhongguo xiandai yuyanxue shi (中囯现代语言学史 "A history of modern Chinese linguistics"). Guangzhou: Guangdong jiaoyu chubanshe.
Zhongguo da baike quanshu (1980–1993). 1st Edition. Beijing; Shanghai: Zhongguo da baike quanshu chubanshe.

External links
 Biography

1866 births
1940 deaths
Chinese expatriates in Japan
Linguists from China
Qing dynasty historians
People of Manchukuo
Republic of China historians
Tangutologists
Writers from Huai'an
Chinese archaeologists
Historians from Jiangsu
19th-century Chinese historians
20th-century Chinese historians
Chinese collaborators with Imperial Japan
Chinese numismatists